Chloride channel CLIC-like 1 also known as  CLCC1 is a human gene.

The protein encoded by this gene is a chloride channel which is related in sequence to the S. cerevisiae MID-1 stretch-activated channel. CLCC1 is located in the membranes of intracellular compartments including endoplasmic reticulum and the Golgi apparatus.  It is highly expressed in the testis and moderately in the spleen, liver, kidney, heart, brain, and lung.

References

Further reading

External links 
 
 

Ion channels